was a town located in Yosa District, Kyoto Prefecture, Japan.

As of 2006, the town had an estimated population of 7,913 and a density of 134 persons per km2. The total area was 59.05 km2.

On March 1, 2006, Kaya, along with the towns of Iwataki and Nodagawa (all from Yosa District), was merged to create the town of Yosano.

Sister cities
Kaya's sister-town was Aberystwyth in Wales.

See also
Groups of Traditional Buildings

Dissolved municipalities of Kyoto Prefecture
Yosano, Kyoto